Pane di Laterza is a traditional bread of Laterza, a little municipality in the province of Taranto, in Apulia, in Southeastern Italy. It is made with durum flour with water, salt and sourdough. It is mainly produced in Laterza, but it can be also found in neighbouring municipalities. It has been recognised by the Italian Ministry of the Agriculture, Food and Forestry Policies as Traditional Food Product (Prodotto Agroalimentare Tradizionale PAT) of Apulia.

Origins 
Agriculture has ever been fundamental for the economy of Laterza. The first evidence of the use of cereals for the production of bread date back to 5th-century b.C. Spelt and barley were the most used ones, above all for what was called focaccia. After the Roman period, for several centuries, the production of bread was only for the noble people who could manage a bakery. In the district called nowadays "Fornaci"  ( Furnaces which, in Italian, stands also for bakeries), an ancient oven for bread has been found. It had been active until 18th century and it belonged to a feudatory.

In the 50s, the bakeries were managed by only four women: a baker and three workers. The workers prepared the firewood and took the dough from the houses of the village. The baker cooked it and then the workers brought the baked bread in the houses again.

Characteristics 
Pane di Laterza is baked in the wood oven with olive wood with some other natural aromatic products like seeds of apricot and almonds. The size of each piece of bread (called panelle or panédd in local dialect) can amount to one, two and four kg. The crust is brown while the soft part inside the bread is ivory.

For 100 grams:

Consortium 
Consorzio per il Pane di Laterza, Laterza (Taranto)

Laterza is also a member of the National Association of the Cities of Bread (Associazione nazionale Città del pane), an Italian organization with the aim of promoting and enhancing the traditional types of bread.

See also 

Pane di Altamura

References 

Italian breads
Cuisine of Apulia